So This is Goodbye is the second studio album by Canadian electronic music group Junior Boys. It was first released by Domino Recording Company on August 22, 2006 in Canada, and on September 11, 2006 in other territories. Junior Boys, now solely comprising the duo of Jeremy Greenspan and Matthew Didemus following the departure of founding member Johnny Dark, recorded the album in Hamilton, Ontario and wrote much of the album's material, with the exception of a cover of the Frank Sinatra song "When No One Cares".

So This Is Goodbye was shortlisted for the 2007 Polaris Music Prize. On June 5, 2007, Junior Boys released So This Is Goodbye as a special edition featuring the original album along with a bonus CD.

Reception

So This Is Goodbye was released to positive reviews from music critics, holding a score of 79 out of 100 on the review aggregator website Metacritic, indicating "generally favorable reviews". Noel Murray of The A.V. Club wrote that Junior Boys "hold to a style that's danceable but purposefully dry", adding that their "emphasis on the aloof and mechanical doesn't diminish their feeling for how humans relate to technology". Mark Pytlik of Pitchfork hailed it as "among the best records you'll hear all year", writing that in spite of Junior Boys' departure from the "rhythmic capriciousness" of their debut Last Exit in favor of more "comparatively streamlined song structures", the album "draws out so many of the same sensations and colors that it feels like a natural next step". Andy Kellman of AllMusic noted the prominence of "slowly unfurling material that projects a cool sense of comfort", as well as a "semi-subliminal undercurrent of self-deprecation that carries through most of the album" in its lyrics. In the Los Angeles Times, Ann Powers wrote that Greenspan explores themes of desire with an "uncommon delicacy", while observing a "distance to Greenspan's perfectly constructed grooves and well-modulated lyrics that falls somewhere between ironic and mournful."

In a mixed review, Dom Passantino of The Guardian called So This Is Goodbye "pretty, if sterile", while nonetheless concluding that "despite their lack of heart, there's no reason Junior Boys shouldn't be able to survive." Spins Michaelangelo Matos was far more critical, writing that the album suffered from the absence of former member Johnny Dark's "rhythmic contributions" and, with the exception of "In the Morning", "turns the pathos of [Last Exit] into nearly intolerable bathos".

Accolades
Resident Advisor named So This Is Goodbye as the third best album of 2006, while Pitchfork ranked it the eleventh best album of the year. Resident Advisor later named it the 45th best album of the decade. As of March 2016, Acclaimed Music, a site which aggregates hundreds of critics' lists from around the world into an all-time ranking, lists the album as the 1133rd most acclaimed of all-time.

Track listing

Charts

References

2006 albums
Domino Recording Company albums
Junior Boys albums